Sarayakpınar is a village in the Edirne District of Edirne Province in Turkey.

References

Villages in Edirne District